Glycymeris modesta, or the small dog cockle, is a marine bivalve mollusc in the family Glycymerididae.

References
 Powell A. W. B., William Collins Publishers Ltd, Auckland 1979 

modesta
Bivalves of New Zealand
Molluscs described in 1879